The KOD Tour was the eighth headlining concert tour by American recording artist J. Cole, in support of his fifth studio album, KOD (2018). The tour began on August 9, 2018 in Miami at the American Airlines Arena and concluded on October 10, 2018 in Boston at TD Garden.

Background
J. Cole announced the tour on May 8, 2018. Rapper Young Thug was announced as the supporting act. In an interview with Atlanta's Hot 107.9, rapper Lil Baby revealed that he was originally going to be on the tour. On July 30, 2018, it was announced that rapper Jaden Smith, duo EarthGang and Cole's alter ego kiLL edward would be joining Young Thug as supporting acts on the tour.

Opening acts
 Young Thug
 Jaden Smith
 EarthGang
 kiLL edward

Set list
This set list is representative of the show on August 9, 2018 in Miami. It is not representative of all concerts for the duration of the tour.

 "Window Pain (Outro)"
 "A Tale of 2 Citiez"
 "Fire Squad"
 "Photograph"
 "The Cut Off"
 "Deja Vu"
 "ATM"
 "Motiv8"
 "Kevin's Heart"
 "Brackets"
 "Nobody's Perfect"
 "Work Out"
 "Can't Get Enough"
 "Ville Mentality"
 "Neighbors"
 "Love Yourz"
 "Apparently"
 "Wet Dreamz"
 "G.O.M.D."
 "Power Trip"
 "KOD"
 "Friends" 
 "1985 (Intro to The Fall Off)"
 "No Role Modelz"

Tour dates

Notes

References

2018 concert tours
J. Cole